The men's road race at the 1962 UCI Road World Championships was the 29th edition of the event. The race took place on Sunday 2 September 1962 in Salò, Italy. The race was won by Jean Stablinski of France.

Final classification

References

Men's Road Race
UCI Road World Championships – Men's road race
1962 Super Prestige Pernod